The Cassi were a tribe of Iron Age Britain.

Cassi may also refer to:

People with the name
 Cassi Davis (born 1964), American actress and singer
 Cassi Thomson (born 1993), Australian-American actress and singer
 Cassi Van Den Dungen (born 1992), Australian model

Other uses
 Cassi Hill, a residential area in Saint Thomas, United States Virgin Islands
 Chemical Abstracts Service Source Index, from the American Chemical Society

See also
 Casey (disambiguation)
 Cassandra (disambiguation)
 Cassie (disambiguation)
 Cassis (disambiguation)
 Kassandra (disambiguation)
 Kassi (disambiguation)
 Kassie (disambiguation)